Donald Joseph Bolen (born 7 February 1961), also known as Don Bolen, is a Canadian Roman Catholic prelate. He is the Archbishop of the Roman Catholic Archdiocese of Regina, since his appointment by Pope Francis on 11 July 2016; having previously served as Bishop of the Roman Catholic Diocese of Saskatoon. Archbishop Bolen was born in Gravelbourg, Saskatchewan, in 1961, the son of Joseph and Rose. He was ordained a priest in 1991 for the Roman Catholic Archdiocese of Regina, and was consecrated as a bishop on 25 March 2010 for the Diocese of Saskatoon.

Academics
 1978-1984 (intermittently): B.A. Honours in Religious Studies at the University of Regina
 1986-1989: B.Th. in Theology, Saint Paul University, Ottawa
 1989-1990, 1993-94: M.Th. and Licentiate in Theology, Saint Paul University, Ottawa
 1994-1997, 2000-2001: Work on D.Phil. in Theology, University of Oxford

Ministry positions
 1991-1993: Associate Pastor, Estevan
 1994: Priest Moderator at Church of Our Lady, Moose Jaw
 1997-1999: Priest Moderator, Milestone and Lang Parishes
 1997-1999: Administrator, Paroisse St. Jean Baptiste, Regina
 1997-2001: Faculty, Dept. of Religious Studies, Campion College, University of Regina
 2000-2001: Priest Moderator, St. Jean-Baptiste, Regina
 2001-2008: Staff member at the Pontifical Council for Promoting Christian Unity, Rome, staffing Anglican-Roman Catholic and Methodist-Roman Catholic relations and the preparation of texts for the Week of Prayer for Christian Unity. Served as Co-secretary of the Anglican-Roman Catholic International Commission (ARCIC), the International Anglican-Roman Catholic Commission for Unity and Mission (IARCCUM) and the Methodist-Roman Catholic International Commission.
 2009: Nash Chair in Religion, Campion College, University of Regina
 2009: Pastor of St. Joseph, Balgonie; St. Agnes, Pilot Butte; and St. Peter’s Colony, Kronau
 2009: Vicar General of the Archdiocese of Regina
 2010-2016: Bishop of Saskatoon
 2016–present: Archbishop of Regina

Commissions and committees
 1997-2001, 2009, Chair of Ecumenical Commission, Archdiocese of Regina

Canadian Conference of Catholic Bishops
 2018 to present: Member of the Episcopal Commission for Christian Unity, Religious Relations with the Jews, and Interfaith Dialogue
 2012 to 2019: Co-Chair of the Anglican-Roman Catholic Dialogue in Canada
 2014 to 2018: Chairman of the Episcopal Commission for Justice and Peace
 2011 to 2018: Member of the Episcopal Commission for Justice and Peace

International
 2012 to present: Member of the Pontifical Council for Promoting Christian Unity
 2011 to present: Co-Chair of the International Anglican-Roman Catholic Commission for Unity and Mission (IARCCUM) 
 2013 to 2016: Co-Chair of the Methodist-Roman Catholic International Commission
 2009 to 2016: Member of the International Consultation Between the World Evangelical Alliance and the Catholic Church
 2003 to 2008: Secretary of the International Anglican-Roman Catholic Commission for Unity and Mission (IARCCUM)
 2003 to 2005: Secretary of the Anglican-Roman Catholic International Commission (ARCIC II)

Honours
 2008: Awarded the Cross of St Augustine by Archbishop of Canterbury Rowan Williams for service to relations between the Catholic Church and the Anglican Communion (2008)
 2009: Nash Lecturer, Campion College, University of Regina
 2014: Honorary Fellow of the College of Emmanuel and St. Chad, University of Saskatchewan

References

External links

1961 births
Living people
21st-century Roman Catholic archbishops in Canada
People from Gravelbourg, Saskatchewan
University of Regina alumni
Saint Paul University alumni
Alumni of the University of Oxford
Roman Catholic archbishops of Regina
Roman Catholic bishops of Saskatoon